Mokpo Cultural Complex() is located at the city of Mokpo for meeting demands of residents in terms of performing arts and exhibition. It is near Gatbawi and belongs to the districts of culture and tourism.

The 2 wings exist to be divided into performing arts and exhibition for former to seat 700 people at most. Owing to the lack of the scale, it is said that that building is least for accommodating many audience for children's performance or music festival. 

The exhibition hall hosts several city councils and groups like Korean calligraphy, Korean picture and orchids to have annual convention and exhibition throughout year. Except for the artistic features, classic musicians visit here to provide experiences of high-quality genre for dwellers

The night lighting project of the city enlightened the museum all around.

Bus
 Bus No.7 and 15 crosses the building while no.20 nearly gives accessibility, reaching Gatbawi tunnel.

주석

Mokpo
Buildings and structures in South Jeolla Province
Tourist attractions in South Jeolla Province
Arts centres in South Korea